Gumasan station is a closed railway station in South Korea. It was on the Gyeongjeon Line.

Defunct railway stations in South Korea